The Lee-Longsworth House in Bolivar, West Virginia, is an example of the transition from Georgian style architecture to the Federal style.  It preserves significant features of interior woodwork, and is associated with the Lee family of Virginia.  The property was in 1799 leased by its then owner, Thomas Wilson, to the US Government.  At some point after that time, the property was purchased by Richard B. Lee, his wife Elizabeth, Edmond I. Lee and Walton Jones to Ferdinando Fairfax for $3000, subject to the government lease.

Throughout the nineteenth century the house changed hands frequently and was entangled in a number of court proceedings. During the American Civil War it is alleged that Stonewall Jackson occupied the house for a brief time,

References

American Civil War sites in West Virginia
Fairfax family residences
Federal architecture in West Virginia
Georgian architecture in West Virginia
Houses completed in 1800
Houses in Jefferson County, West Virginia
Houses on the National Register of Historic Places in West Virginia
Jefferson County, West Virginia in the American Civil War
Lee family residences
National Register of Historic Places in Jefferson County, West Virginia